Tales of Paris is a 1962 comedy-drama anthology film consisting of four segments.

Plot

Cast

Sophie 
 Catherine Deneuve as Sophie
 Johnny Hallyday as Jean Allard
 Elina Labourdette as Jacqueline
 Gillian Hills as Theodora
 Gisèle Sandré as Suzanne
 Berthe Granval as Suzanne
 France Anglade as a college girl
 Danièle Évenou as a college girl
 Paloma Matta as a college girl
 J.L. de Villalonga as Louis
 Yves Barsacq as the traveler
 Henri Attal as a passenger
 Dominique Zardi as a passenger
* Director: Marc Allégret. Screenplay: Marc Allégret, Francis Cosne, Roger Vadim. Cinematography : Armand Thirard

Françoise 
 Françoise Arnoul as Françoise
 Françoise Brion as Jacqueline
 Paul Guers as Michel
 François Patrice as the playboy 
* Director: Claude Barma. Screenplay: Jacques Armand, Claude Barma, Claude Brulé.  Cinematography: Armand Thirard

Antonia 
 Christian Marquand as Christian Lénier
 Jean Poiret as Jean-Pierre Leroy
 Dany Robin as Antonia
 Bernard Lavalette as Richard 
* Director: Michel Boisrond. Screenplay: Michel Boisrond, Francis Cosne, Annette Wademant.  Cinematography: Henri Alekan.

Ella 
 Darry Cowl as Hubert Parker
 Dany Saval as Ella
 Françoise Giret as Juliette
 Anne-Marie Bellini as Ella's friend
 Ellen Bahl as Ella's friend
 Olga Georges-Picot as the secretary
 Henri Tisot as Éric
 Jack Ary as Pidoux
 Serge Marquand as taxi driver
 Donald O'Brien as American tourist
 Les Chaussettes Noires as themselves
 Eddy Mitchell as himself
* Director: Jacques Poitrenaud. Screenplay: Jean-Loup Dabadie. Cinematography: Henri Alekan.

References

External links
 
 
 
 Review at The New York Times

1962 films
1962 comedy-drama films
1960s French films
1960s French-language films
1960s Italian films
Films directed by Claude Barma
Films directed by Jacques Poitrenaud
Films directed by Marc Allégret
Films directed by Michel Boisrond
Films with screenplays by Jean-Loup Dabadie
French anthology films
French black-and-white films
French comedy-drama films
French-language Italian films
Italian anthology films
Italian black-and-white films
Italian comedy-drama films